Andalusia is an unincorporated area located by Florida State Road 100 in the western part of Flagler County, Florida, United States. It is east of Crescent Lake.

History
In 1911, Falco Lumber Company established a railroad from their mill company headquartered in Falco, Alabama, to Galliver north.

References

External links
 Florida Smart City at a Glance

Towns in Flagler County, Florida
Towns in Florida
Populated coastal places in Florida on the Atlantic Ocean
Beaches of Flagler County, Florida